Hwang In-sun (born January 13, 1987) is a South Korean singer and television personality who appeared on Produce 101 and Society Game.

Discography

Singles

Soundtrack appearances

Other appearances

Filmography

Television

Film

References

External links
 

1987 births
Living people
K-pop singers
South Korean female idols
South Korean women pop singers
Sungkyunkwan University alumni
Produce 101 contestants
Society Game contestants
21st-century South Korean women singers
21st-century South Korean singers